Henry II of Niemodlin (1374 – 22 December 1394) was a Duke of Strzelce and Niemodlin since 1382 until his death (with his brothers as co-rulers and only formally).

He was the third son of Duke Bolko III of Strzelce by his wife Anna, probably daughter of Duke Jan I of Oświęcim.

Life
There are little notices about Henry II's life. Since his early years, he was destined to the Church career and had to study at the University of Bologna. According to the chronicle of Jan Długosz, Henry II died during his return trip to Poland on 22 December 1394. He was buried in the Ducal vault of the Franciscan church in Opole.

References

Gnealogical database by Herbert Stoyan

|-

1374 births
1394 deaths
Piast dynasty